Shri Durgiana Mandir (Punjabi: ਸ਼੍ਰੀ ਦੁਰਗਿਆਨਾ ਮੰਦਿਰ) (Hindi: श्री दुर्गियाना मंदिर), is a Hindu temple situated in the city of Amritsar, Punjab, India. Though a Hindu temple, its architecture is similar to the Sikh Harmandir Sahib (Golden Temple). This temple derives its name from the Goddess Durga, the chief Goddess who is worshipped here. Murtis of  Lakshmi and Vishnu are also located and worshipped in the temple.

Although it is believed that Durgiana Mandir was built in 1921, the temple existed before it was rebuilt in 1921. It is confirmed by record in Amritsar District Gazetteer of 1893, which talks about Durgiana Sarovar and "Devi dwara" surrounding it which was thronged by Hindu pilgrims.

History and architecture

The Sri Durgiana temple is a very important temple for Hindus. In the courtyard of the temple is a tree where Lava and Kusha bound Hanuman after the captured challenge horse of the Ashvamedha yajna. Iksvaku, the grandson of sun-god, performed a number of yagyas on this land. The original temple was built in 16th century. 

The architecture of Sri Durgiana Temple is similar to Shri Harmandir Sahib. It was built in 1921 by Guru Harsai Mal Kapoor in the architectural style of the Sikh Shri Harmandir Sahib (Golden Temple) . Harsai Mal was a descendant of Prithi Chand and hence Guru Ram Das.The grandchildren of Harsai Mal Kapoor is currently living in amritsar and one of caretakers of the idol of Harsai mal Kapoor. 

Existence of the Talab is also mentioned in 1868 Municipal committee, Amritsar documents. John Campbell Oman who was Professor of natural science in The Government College, Lahore mentioned about durgiana in his book where he found some mystics practicing yoga.
Durgiana Mandir is recorded in Amritsar District Gazetteer of 1893 which talks about Durgiana Sarovar and "Devi dwara" surrounding it which was thronged by Hindu pilgrims.

Even though Amritsar is not declared a Holy city, restrictions are in force prohibiting sale of tobacco, liquor and meat within a radius of  around this temple and the Shri Harmandir Sahib (Sikh Golden Temple).

Location

The temple is situated near the Hathi gate in Amritsar.

Features and designs
The temple is built in the middle of a sacred lake, which measures  × . Its dome and canopies are similar to that of the Golden temple of Sikh religion, also located in Amritsar. A bridge provides the approach to the temple. The dome of the temple is gilded. Marble is used extensively in the temple's features. The dome is illuminated with colourful lights. The temple is sometimes called Silver temple because of its large exquisitely designed silver doors. It has a rich collection of Hindu scriptures. The temple complex also has some historic subsidiary temples such as Seetla Mata and Bara Hanuman.

Festivals and Cultural events
Major Hindu festivals celebrated in the temple are Dussehra, Janmashtami, Rama Navami, and Diwali. A Sāwan festival is also celebrated in Durgiana Mandir in the Holy Shravan month of Hindu Calendar where newlywed couples gather at temple to worship Radha Krishna. Women adorn themselves with flower jewellery and worship at temple along with their husbands. Another festival celebrated in Durgiana temple complex is the famous 'Langur Mela' during 10 days of Navratri and Dussehra. Pilgrims in large numbers throng to the Bada Hanuman temple, with their children dressed as Langur to offer prayers in this temple, situated in the Durgiana temple complex.

Renovation
The temple and its precincts were under a beautification programme since 2013, and was completed in 2015. This will provide more space for worship both inside and outside the temple premises. As per the Master Plan prepared for reshaping the environment around the temple, 55 properties had been acquired with adequate compensation package and demolished for the purpose of development works. Under this plan, a multi-storied parking complex, an open-air theatre, a shopping complex and other facilities were under construction.

See also
 List of Hindu temples in India
 Mukteshwar Mahadev Temple
 Shri Kali Devi Temple, Patiala

References

Notes

External links

Tourist attractions in Amritsar
Hindu temples in Punjab, India
Durga temples
Hindu temples in Amritsar district
16th-century Hindu temples
20th-century Hindu temples